Eighteenth Army or 18th Army may refer to:

Germany
 18th Army (German Empire), a World War I field Army
 18th Army (Wehrmacht), a World War II field army

Others
18th Army (Soviet Union)
Eighteenth Army (Japan)